Saint-Léonard is a commune in the Pas-de-Calais department in the Hauts-de-France region of France.

Geography
The A16 autoroute forms the eastern border of the commune and the river Liane the western.

Population

Places of interest
 The church of St.Léonard, dating from the twelfth century and now a historical monument.
 The modern church of St. Therése
 The Château de Pont-de-Briques, (dating from the seventeenth century), a registered monument.
 The nineteenth century Château Neuf.
 Château des Lions (also known as Château Muhlberg), a château from the nineteenth century, now an orphanage

See also
Communes of the Pas-de-Calais department

References

External links

 Official website of the commune of Saint-Léonard 

Saintleonard